The Virginians: A Tale of the Last Century (1857–59) is a historical novel by William Makepeace Thackeray which forms a sequel to his Henry Esmond and is also loosely linked to Pendennis.

Plot summary
The novel tells the story of Henry Esmond's twin grandsons, Virginia-born George and Henry Warrington.  Henry's romantic entanglement with an older woman leads to his volunteering in the British army and fighting under the command of General Wolfe at the 1759 capture of Quebec.  On the outbreak of the American War of Independence he takes the revolutionary side.  George, who also becomes a British officer, eventually resigns his commission rather than continuing in arms against his brother.

Critical reception
Critical reception of the book was on the whole favourable, and the novel has continued to be considered one of the standard works of 19th century fiction, though many critics have held that the novel's plotting was not of the tightest.  Anthony Trollope's opinion was typical:

There is not a page of it vacant or dull. But he who takes it up to read as a whole, will find that it is the work of a desultory writer, to whom it is not infrequently difficult to remember the incidents of his own narrative.

Later critics have been less kind. An apocryphal story claims that Thackeray once confessed to Douglas William Jerrold that The Virginians was "the worst novel he ever wrote," while Jerrold replied, "No. It's the worst novel anyone ever wrote." In fact, Jerrold died before the first volume of The Virginians was published. J. A. Sutherland agreed to a degree, calling it Thackeray's worst major novel. John Halperin called it "the worst book ever produced by a great novelist." Jack P. Rawlins wrote that "The Virginians is a bad book — dissatisfying in the reading, acknowledged as dull and dried-up by Thackeray."

Publication history
The Virginians was issued by Thackeray's publishers, Bradbury and Evans, in 24 monthly parts, the first one appearing on November 1, 1857.  It was illustrated by the author himself.  The print-run of 20,000 for the first number proved to be too optimistic and was progressively reduced to 13,000 for the last seven.  Thackeray was originally to have been paid £300 per number, but the disappointing sales resulted in this being reduced to £250.

The Virginians was first published in book form in 1858-59 by Bradbury and Evans in two volumes, and almost simultaneously by the Leipzig firm of Bernhard Tauchnitz in four.  Notable later reprints include its appearance as volume 15 of The Oxford Thackeray in 1908 with an introduction by George Saintsbury, and the 1911 Everyman's Library edition in two volumes.

Notes

External links 
Full-text online editions
 Project Gutenberg
 Penn State Electronic Classics
 The Literature Network
 Volume 1 and Volume 2 at Google Books
 

Novels by William Makepeace Thackeray
Novels set in Virginia
1857 British novels
Novels first published in serial form
Historical novels